Janasewa Secondary School (or Jana Sewa School) is a school located in Ramailo, Kanepokhari -6, Morang District, Nepal.

Students

According to the school's website, as of 2020 it had about 35 staff members and was the home or center of excellence to 1,600 students.
According to the Morang Education Development And Coordination Unit, the number of higher secondary students at the school is between 53 and 178.

Program

The school is affiliated with National Examination Board.
It offers "Ten Plus Two" courses in Education and Management.

Alumni

 Jamuna Gurung (footballer), captain of the Nepal women's national football team in 2012, was born and raised in Ramailo. She learned to play soccer at the Jana Sewa School.

References

Schools in Nepal
Kanepokhari Rural Municipality
1968 establishments in Nepal